Xiongyue, or Xiongyuecheng  is a town in Bayuquan District, Yingkou, Liaoning, China, located on the eastern coast of Liaodong Bay. , It has 5 residential communities and 14 villages under its administration.

References

Towns in Liaoning